Simon Currant, AM is a tourism developer in Tasmania, Australia. Currant currently serves as a director of the Tourism Council of Tasmania and a Director of TT-Line Pty. Ltd.

His past tourism developments include the Strahan Village, Cradle Mountain Lodge, Peppermint Bay and Pumphouse Point.

He was awarded a Centenary Medal in 2001, Tasmanian of the Year in 2004 and appointed an honorary Member of the Order of Australia in 2006.

References

Living people
Year of birth missing (living people)
People from Tasmania
Australian businesspeople
Honorary Members of the Order of Australia